is a live album by Japanese singer/songwriter Chisato Moritaka, released on May 15, 2013. Recorded live at the Yokohama Blitz in Yokohama, Japan on November 24, 2012, this was Moritaka's first-ever live album and was part of her personal campaign to self-cover 200 songs on her YouTube channel. The album includes a bonus DVD that highlights the making of four self-cover videos.

The album peaked at No. 69 on Oricon's albums chart and No. 57 on Billboard Japan's top albums sales chart.

Track listing 
All lyrics are written by Chisato Moritaka, except where indicated.

 Tracks 1-13 are for vocal recording. Tracks 14-24 are for drums recording.

Personnel 
 Chisato Moritaka – vocals (CD & DVD), drums (DVD)
 Yuichi Takahashi – guitar, keyboard, backing vocals
 Shinji Yasuda – drums, backing vocals

Charts

References

External links 
  (Chisato Moritaka)
  (Up-Front Works)
 

2013 live albums
Chisato Moritaka albums
Japanese-language live albums